Langensendelbach is a municipality in the district of Forchheim in Bavaria in Germany with a population of over 3100. The village Bräuningshof is a part of Langensendelbach.

Langensendelbach was first mentioned on 13 July 1062. Thereafter Langensendelbach was a part of the bistum Bamberg. In 1400 St Peter and Paul chapel was built, and in the fourteenth and fifteenth century a small gothic church was built. In 1896 the priest Wölfel found an old German bodygrave from the fifth century. In World War I twenty two men from Langensendelbach died. In World War II eighty eight men had to fight; nineteen of them died in the war or in prison. A few days before the War ended, SS troops were in the village; the US Army attacked them, and three children and one man died.

References

Forchheim (district)